Island of Rusty General is a 1988 Soviet children's science fiction film directed by Valentin Khovenko, based on the Island of the Rusted Lieutenant from the short story collection Adventures of Alisa by Kir Bulychov.

Plot
Alisa Seleznyova, an ordinary Moscow schoolgirl of the 21st century, gets the role of the Little Red Riding Hood in a children's film and flies off for the shooting. At this time during an excavation old fighting robots are discovered and sent for remelting, but they disappear on the way by the sea. It turns out that they did not completely lose their military capabilities and were able to escape, land on an uninhabited island and begin preparations to enslave humanity. One day after leaving from the filming, Alisa ends up getting captured by them.

Cast
Katya Prizhbilyak — Alisa Seleznyova
Alexander Lenkov — Baba Yaga
Mikhail Danilov — director Stepan Stepanych
Lyudmila Artemieva — Svetlana Odinokaya (voiced by Olga Gasparova)
Stanislav Sokolov — Technician Egorushkin
Sergey Skripkin — robot Polya
Natalia Grigoryeva — TV announcer
Marina Sauskan — assistant director (credited as M. Vakulina)
Vladimir Balon — general "Big Iron" (voiced by Sergei Malishevsky)

References

External links

Studio Ekran films
Soviet science fiction adventure films
1980s science fiction adventure films
Robot films
Russian children's films
1980s children's adventure films
Films based on works by Kir Bulychov
Soviet children's films